Joshua Deshaun Dollard (born September 2, 1986) is an American professional basketball player who last played for Bambitious Nara in Japan.

The Basketball Tournament

In 2017, Dollard played for team Ole Hotty Toddy of The Basketball Tournament. Ole Hotty Toddy was upset in the first round of the tournament by NC Prodigal Sons. The Basketball Tournament is an annual $2 million winner-take-all tournament broadcast on ESPN.

References

1986 births
Living people
American expatriate basketball people in Canada
American expatriate basketball people in Colombia
American expatriate basketball people in the Czech Republic
American expatriate basketball people in the Dominican Republic
American expatriate basketball people in Finland
American expatriate basketball people in Greece
American expatriate basketball people in Japan
American expatriate basketball people in Lebanon
American expatriate basketball people in the Philippines
American expatriate basketball people in Saudi Arabia
American expatriate basketball people in South Korea
American expatriate basketball people in Switzerland
American expatriate basketball people in Turkey
Auburn Tigers men's basketball players
Bambitious Nara players
Barako Bull Energy players
Changwon LG Sakers players
Darüşşafaka Basketbol players
Halifax Rainmen players
Kolossos Rodou B.C. players
Osaka Evessa players
People from Hemingway, South Carolina
Rain or Shine Elasto Painters players
Shinshu Brave Warriors players
USC Aiken Pacers men's basketball players
American men's basketball players
Power forwards (basketball)
Sagesse SC basketball players